Ebenezer Ekuban Jr. (born May 29, 1976) is a former American football defensive end in the National Football League (NFL) for the Dallas Cowboys, Cleveland Browns, and Denver Broncos. He played college football at the University of North Carolina. He is distinguished as being the first Ghanaian to play in the National Football League.

Early years
Ekuban started playing American football during his junior year at Bladensburg High School. As a senior, he was a two-way player at tight end and defensive end, recording 28 receptions for 546 yards, 5 touchdowns, 76 tackles and 11 sacks. He was also an honor student.

He accepted a football scholarship from the University of North Carolina. As a freshman, he was a backup tight end and played in the final 8 games, making only one reception for 4-yard touchdown.

As a sophomore, he appeared in 10 games, tallying 5 receptions for 62 yards. Against the University of Houston, he had a season-long reception of 22 yards and a 4-yard touchdown.

As a junior, he was moved to defensive end. He played in 10 games (2 starts), collecting 40 tackles (9 for loss), 5 sacks, 12 quarterback pressures, 2 passes defensed and one forced fumble. Against the University of Maryland, he made 9 tackles (4 for loss) and 3 sacks.

As a senior, he became a full-time starter, registering 96 tackles, 7 sacks (led the team), 3 quarterback pressures, 4 passes defensed, 2 forced fumbles, one blocked kick and a school record 23 tackles for loss. Against Clemson University, he had a career-high 16 tackles (4 for loss), 2 sacks and one forced fumble. He received second-team All-American and All-ACC honors. He also made the Dean's List and received the Jim Tatum award for the ACC's top student athlete, because of his academic achievements.

Professional career

Pre-Draft

Dallas Cowboys
Although the Dallas Cowboys had invested their first draft choice in selecting a defensive end in 3 of the previous 5 drafts, they were still looking to replace the production of Charles Haley and Tony Tolbert. With only two years of total experience at defensive end, the team thought that Ekuban was coming into his own, so they traded to the Seattle Seahawks the 22nd (Lamar King) and 140th (Floyd Wedderburn) selections, in exchange for the 20th pick, in order to select him in the first round of the 1999 NFL draft.

The Cowboys wanted Ekuban to become the pass-rushing bookend to former Tar Heel teammate Greg Ellis. As a rookie, he played in 16 games, posting 33 tackles (3 for loss), 2.5 sacks (tied for sixth on the team) and 10 quarterback pressures. He started the final 2 contests in place of an injured Ellis and was named to the NFL All-Rookie team. 

In 2000, he started the first 2 games, before being moved back to a reserve role behind Alonzo Spellman. Although he missed 4 games with a dislocated right toe he suffered in the fourth game against the San Francisco 49ers, he still led the team with 6.5 sacks and 2 forced fumbles. He also had 25 tackles (4 for loss) and 7 quarterback pressures.

In 2001, he was named the starter at right defensive end, but suffered a herniated disc in the season-opener against the Tampa Bay Buccaneers and had surgery on September 17. He returned to practice on a limited basis on November 9, but still suffered pain and was forced to be placed on the injured reserve list on December 21. He finished with one tackle and one quarterback hurry.

In 2002, he registered 15 starts, 43 tackles (2 for loss), one sack, 20 quarterback pressures and one forced fumble. Although he played a key role in the defense, he was still one of just five starting defensive ends in the NFL with one or no sacks.

In 2003, he had 1.5 sacks in the second game against the New York Giants, but would later find himself in new head coach Bill Parcells' dog house. He was eventually deactivated in the thirteenth game against the Philadelphia Eagles, with Eric Ogbogu taking his starting position in that contest and against the Washington Redskins. This led to a brief public confrontation between the two in the media. He recorded 30 tackles (3 for loss), 2.5 sacks, 12 quarterback pressures and 2 forced fumbles.

At the end of the year, the Cowboys did not make an attempt to re-sign him, preferring to instead sign free agent defensive end Marcellus Wiley.

Cleveland Browns
On March 10, 2004, he signed with the Cleveland Browns as a free agent, reuniting with defensive coordinator Dave Campo, who was his head coach with the Cowboys. Playing alongside Gerard Warren and Courtney Brown, who were also considered first round disappointments, he went on to have a strong season with 54 tackles, 2 passes defensed, 2 fumble recoveries, one forced fumble and a career-high 8 sacks in 16 games (11 starts).

In 2005, new head coach Romeo Crennel looked to change the defensive line personnel, in order to implement a new 3–4 defense. On March 30, Ekuban along with defensive tackle Michael Myers, were traded to the Denver Broncos in exchange for running back Reuben Droughns.

Denver Broncos
In 2005, with the Broncos also signing free agent Courtney Brown, as well as obtaining Ekuban, Myers and Gerard Warren in separate trades with the Browns, the local media referred to the Broncos new defensive line as the "Browncos", since all four starters were also the Browns starters the year before, under new defensive line coach Andre Patterson. He registered 41 tackles, 4 sacks (tied for the team lead), 2 passes defensed and one forced fumble in 16 games (4 starts). 

In 2006, he had 78 tackles, 7 sacks (second on the team), 2 passes defensed and one forced fumble in 15 starts. Ekuban missed the entire 2007 season due to a right Achilles tendon tear, suffered in the second preseason game against his former team, the Dallas Cowboys.

In 2008, he was re-signed to a one-year $3.12 million contract, to compete with Jarvis Moss and John Engelberger for the left defensive end position. Ekuban was the last remaining "Brownco", as Warren was traded to the Oakland Raiders the year before and Brown and Myers were waived in previous years. He finished the season with 49 tackles, 5 sacks (tied for the team lead), one pass defensed and one fumble recovery in 15 games (10 starts).

In 2009, new head coach Josh McDaniels implemented a 3-4 defense and decided not to re-sign him, since he was not considered a good fit for the scheme.

NFL statistics

Personal life
In the fall of 2010, Ekuban assisted the football staff at Regis Jesuit High School in Aurora, Colorado as an assistant coach. He also was hired by the Denver Broncos to serve in their player development department.

Trivia
Ekuban has been said to have "the perfect name for an evil wizard" by BioWare video game writer Brad Prince.

References

1976 births
Living people
American football defensive ends
North Carolina Tar Heels football players
Dallas Cowboys players
Cleveland Browns players
Denver Broncos players
American sportspeople of Ghanaian descent
Ghanaian players of American football